The Services Union is a trade union representing white collar workers in Denmark.

The union was founded in 1911 as the Union of Insurance Officers, and affiliated to the Danish Confederation of Trade Unions (LO).  In time, workers from other industries joined the union, and it changed its name to the Danish Union of Professional and Technical Employees.  It adopted its current name in 2009.

The union consists of 11 sectoral associations, covering banking, property services, professionals, watchmakers and opticians, refinery technicians, hairdressers and cosmeticians, cleaning, security, dairy, and agriculture.  The newest of these is the Danish Hairdressers' and Beauticians' Union, which was independent until 2013.

As of 2018, the union had 15,121 members.  Since 2019, it has been affiliated to LO's successor, the Danish Trade Union Confederation.

External links

References

Clerical trade unions
Trade unions established in 1911
Trade unions in Denmark